Blondes Have More Fun is Rod Stewart's ninth album, released in November 1978. As was the popular musical trend at the time, it is Stewart's foray into disco music. The album was commercially successful, reaching number 3 in the UK and number 1 in the US, but was critically divisive. The lead single "Da Ya Think I'm Sexy" became one of Stewart's biggest hits, peaking at No.1 in both the UK and US.

Overview
After carving a highly successful career throughout the 1970s as a rock singer, Stewart elected to follow the disco trend that was at its peak in 1978 for some tracks of this album. The first single was "Da Ya Think I'm Sexy" which became a number one hit in the UK, US, Australia and a number of other countries. Many critics panned the direction of song towards disco, but it nevertheless became one of his biggest hits. Stewart has since defended the song commenting that Paul McCartney and The Rolling Stones had also dabbled with disco music by this time. The second single was "Ain't Love a Bitch", which became a No.11 hit in the UK and No.22 in the US. The third and final single "Blondes (Have More Fun)" peaked at 63 in the UK, his lowest-charting single there at this time, but performed better in Ireland at No.23.

The album itself peaked at No.3 in the UK, being certified platinum by Christmas and was a No.1 hit in the US, where it went triple platinum. It also charted within the top ten in a host of other countries.

Track listing
Side one 

Side two

 Stewart has acknowledged that the song inadvertently incorporates the melody from the song "Taj Mahal" by Jorge Ben Jor, although Ben Jor was not given a writing credit.

Personnel
Rod Stewart Band
Rod Stewart - vocals
Gary Grainger, Billy Peek – guitar
Jim Cregan – guitar, backing vocals
Phil Chen – bass guitar, backing vocals
Carmine Appice – drums, backing vocals

Invited guests
Fred Tackett - acoustic guitars
Nicky Hopkins – piano
Duane Hitchings – keyboards, synthesizer
Roger Bethelmy – drums
Paulinho Da Costa, Tommy Vig – percussion
Gary Herbig – flute
Phil Kenzie, Tom Scott – tenor saxophone
Steve Madaio – trumpet
Mike Finnigan – background vocals
Max Carl Gronenthal – background vocals
Linda Lewis – vocals
Catherine Allison – piano, background vocals
Del Newman – string arrangements

Production
Tom Dowd – producer, mixing
Andy Johns – engineer, mixing
George Tutko, David Gerts – assistant engineers
Mixed at Smoke Tree and Cherokee Studios.

Charts

Weekly charts

Year-end charts

Certifications and sales

References

1978 albums
Riva Records albums
Rod Stewart albums
Albums produced by Tom Dowd
Warner Records albums
Disco albums by British artists